The 1993 FIBA European Championship, commonly called FIBA EuroBasket 1993, was the 28th FIBA EuroBasket regional basketball championship, held by FIBA Europe. It was held in Germany between 22 June and 4 July 1993. Sixteen national teams entered the event under the auspices of FIBA Europe, the sport's regional governing body. The cities of Berlin, Karlsruhe and Munich hosted the tournament. Hosts Germany won their first FIBA European title by defeating Russia with a 71–70 score in the final. Germany's Chris Welp was voted the tournament's MVP. This edition of the FIBA EuroBasket tournament also served as qualification for the 1994 FIBA World Championship, giving a berth to the top five teams in the final standings.

Qualification

Venues

Teams 

It was first decided that 12 teams would participate in EuroBasket 1993, however, after the Qualifying Round was concluded, FIBA Europe decided to expand it up to 16 teams.

The reason for this were politic changes in Eastern Europe caused by breaks of two big countries, Soviet Union and Yugoslavia, which dominated in European basketball in recent decades. Yugoslavia as title holder was excluded from all international sport competitions because of sanctions against Federal Republic of Yugoslavia. Russia was announced as successor of the Soviet Union and the first time competed as independent country at major tournament. Since other new countries, including silver medalist Croatia and bronze medalist Lithuania from the Olympic tournament at Barcelona 1992, did not compete at the Qualifying Round, FIBA Europe organized additional qualifying tournament in order to enable them participation at championship. The additional tournament was held in Wroclaw a month before Eurobasket.

Format
The teams were split in four groups of four teams each. The top three teams from each group advance to the second round.
The 12 teams that qualify to the second round are divided in two groups of six teams each, with one group containing the best three teams from groups A and B, while the other containing the three best teams from groups C and D. Results from the previous round are carried over, but only those against teams that qualified to the second round.
The four best teams in the second round advance to the knockout quarterfinals. The winners in the semifinals compete for the European Championship, while the losers from the semifinals play a consolation game for the third place.
The losers in the quarterfinals compete in another bracket to define 5th through 8th place in the final standings.

Squads

Preliminary round

Group A
Times given below are in Central European Summer Time (UTC+2).

|}

Group B

|}

Group C

|}

Group D

|}

Second round

Group E

|}

Group F

|}

Knockout stage

Championship bracket

Quarterfinals

Semifinals

Third place

Final

5th to 8th place

Awards

Final standings

References

External links
 1993 European Championship for Men archive.FIBA.com
 FIBA Archive
 Eurobasket 1993 at FIBAEUROPE.COM

1992–93 in German basketball
1992–93 in European basketball
1993
International basketball competitions hosted by Germany